The Call of Duty Endowment (CODE) is a 501(c)(3) non-profit foundation co-created by Bobby Kotick, CEO of gaming company Activision Blizzard, to help U.S., and later, UK military veterans find high quality careers. The Endowment funds non-profit organizations that help former service members transition to civilian careers after their military service and raises awareness of the value veterans bring to the workplace. The name of the Endowment is a reference to the video game series Call of Duty.

History 
Kotick and Brian Kelly, chairman of the Activision Blizzard board of directors, co-founded the Call of Duty Endowment in 2009 to address the high unemployment rate for young U.S. veterans who had served in post-9/11 conflicts.

Kotick said the idea for the Endowment came from a conversation with former Veteran's Administration Secretary Jim Nicholson. At the time, Kotick was interested in funding arts programs for veterans, but Nicholson advised him that the most effective way to help veterans was to find them jobs. Kotick said that the high unemployment rate among veterans was unacceptable and should be “far less than the national average, not more,” and that veterans “bring tremendous value to the workplace.”

The Endowment made its first donation of $125,000 in 2009 to the Paralyzed Veterans of America to help open a vocational rehabilitation center. From 2009 to 2011, the Endowment offered several small and medium-sized grants to nonprofit organizations, but the board became concerned that they could not measure the impact of the grants and paused grant making. In 2013, Dan Goldenberg, a Navy veteran and experienced business executive, was hired as executive director. The Endowment changed its strategy to only target supporting organizations with a proven track record of placing veterans into high-quality jobs.

In 2013, the Endowment started the "Seal of Distinction" grant program, which identifies and recognizes non-profit organizations that are successful in placing veterans in quality jobs. The Endowment worked with Deloitte to develop a rigorous assessment process to measure the effectiveness, efficiency and integrity of the nonprofits that apply.  Organizations that receive a Seal of Distinction are also eligible for a $30,000 unrestricted grant to use in their veteran job placement activities, and are then eligible for future funding.

In 2017, the Endowment announced that it would expand its efforts to include veterans in the United Kingdom. RFEA and Walking With The Wounded were the first UK organizations to be awarded the Seal of Distinction and grants.

According to the organization website, primary grantees include AMVETS, Vet Jobs Powered by Corporate America Supports You, Hire Heroes USA, JVS SoCal, Operation: Job Ready Veterans, The Forces Employment Charity (RFEA), Salvation Army Community Integration Services, Still Serving Veterans, US VETS, Veterans Inc., Walking With The Wounded, and Workshops for Warriors.

Impact 
Veterans often face barriers transitioning to civilian careers because their military experience does not transfer easily to civilian jobs. The Call of Duty Endowment funds organizations that help veterans with resume preparation, career coaching, mock interviews, and other skill building to help them enter the civilian workforce. The Endowment also works with employers to show that hiring veterans makes good business sense and that veterans make valuable additions to the workplace.

In 2018, the Endowment announced that it reached its goal of funding the placement of 50,000 veterans into meaningful employment a year ahead of the 2019 deadline it had set. Then the Endowment set a new goal of placing 100,000 U.S. and U.K. veterans into jobs by 2024. In 2019, the Endowment placed more than 11,661 veterans in jobs with an average starting salary of $60,733. As of September 2020, the organization's website reports that it has supported and funded the placement of more than 72,000 veterans into jobs since 2009.

Goldenberg has said that the Seal of Distinction model of veteran job placement costs one sixth of the amount that it costs the U.S. Department of Labor to place a veteran in a job. In 2019, the Endowment reported an average cost of $499 per placement.

Funding 
The Call of Duty Endowment is funded with donations from Activision Blizzard, gamers, corporate partners and individual donors. Activision Blizzard funds all of the operating costs for the Endowment, so 100% of donations go directly to grantees to fund veteran job placements.

The Endowment raises money through promotions and in-game merchandise in the Call of Duty game series. It also partners with retailers such as GameStop, which have historically donated a portion of games sold to the Endowment and raised funds through in-store donation programs, and through efforts with celebrities such as actor Josh Duhamel and Green Bay Packers running back Aaron Jones. In 2019, the Endowment launched the #HireHonor campaign to celebrate its 10th anniversary. The campaign featured a call to action video from former U.S. Secretary of Defense, General James Mattis. General Mattis urged the video's viewers to honor veterans by hiring them and said that combat veterans are great assets to the workforce.

In 2019, the U.S. Army Esports team partnered with the Endowment to launch the CODE Bowl, an event where teams of popular streamers and members of the Army Esports team competed in Call of Duty: Modern Warfare to raise awareness about the value of military service. Streamers also used their channels to raise funds for the Endowment.

In May 2020, Activision Blizzard donated $2 million to the Call of Duty Endowment to help fund emerging needs during the COVID-19 pandemic. The company also launched the Fearless Pack as an in-game purchase in Call of Duty: Modern Warfare and Call of Duty: Warzone with all proceeds going to the Endowment. The organization stated they saw a 50 percent increase in calls for assistance during the pandemic, and advocated for employing veteran medics and hospital corpsmen as emergency medical technicians and paramedics.

Awards and recognition 

 Received Golden Halo Awards for Best Digital Campaign in 2016 and 2017.
 Received Golden Halo Gold Award in Best Social Service Initiative in 2018.
 Received the Cynopsis Social Good Award in the category of Nonprofit/Corporate Partnership in 2017.
 Received a Vetty Award, presented by the Academy of the United States Veterans Foundation, in the Employment category.
 In 2020, the #HireHonor campaign was recognized as a Webby Awards Honoree in the Public Service and Activision Category.
 Guidestar awarded the Endowment the Platinum Seal of Transparency in 2017–2020.

The Endowment was profiled in Uniform Champions: A Wise Giver’s Guide to Excellent Assistance for Veterans, written by Thomas Meyer in 2018.

References

External links

American veterans' organizations
Foundations based in the United States
Call of Duty